Dazhou Island (commonly known as Grand Island or Tinhosa Island) is a state-level nature reserve located about 5 km off the coast of Wanning, Hainan, China. This protected area covers 4.36 square kilometres, and comprises three mountains spanning two islands. These mountains, the tallest of which is 289 metres above sea level, have been used as navigational markers by mariners since the Tang Dynasty.

Geography
The islands are composed of mainly rain forests and rocky terrain.

Wildlife
This group of two islands is home to more than one hundred individual flocks of swifts. These swifts, the only colonies in China, nest in caves. The nests are gathered for bird's nest soup.

References

Islands of Hainan